Cryptoblabes proleucella is a species of moth of the family Pyralidae described by George Hampson in 1896. It is found in India, the Malay Archipelago, Samoa and Taiwan.

The larvae are predators of Hemiptera species.

References

Moths described in 1896
Cryptoblabini